South Dakota Highway 391 (SD 391) is a  state highway in the southwestern part of the U.S. state of South Dakota. It travels from Nebraska Highway 27 (N-27) at the Nebraska state line, southeast of Denby, to U.S. Route 18 (US 18) east-southeast of Denby. The highway is located entirely within Oglala Lakota County and in the Pine Ridge Indian Reservation. It is maintained by the South Dakota Department of Transportation (SDDOT), and is not part of the National Highway System.

Route description
SD 391 begins at the Nebraska state line as a continuation of N-27 and travels northeast through rolling plains on the Pine Ridge Indian Reservation in Oglala Lakota County. The highway curves to the northwest, then bends to the north near its northern terminus. Shortly after this, the route ends at an intersection with US 18.

SD 391 is maintained by SDDOT. In 2012, the traffic on the highway was measured in average annual daily traffic, and SD 391 had an average of 920 vehicles. The designation is not a part of the National Highway System, a system of highways important to the nation's defense, economy, and mobility.

Major intersections

References

External links

The Unofficial South Dakota Highways Page

391
391